Abras is a rural barrio with a small urban area in the municipality of Corozal, Puerto Rico. Its population in 2010 was 2,262.

Features and demographics
Abras has  of land area and no water area.

History
Puerto Rico was ceded by Spain in the aftermath of the Spanish–American War under the terms of the Treaty of Paris of 1898 and became an unincorporated territory of the United States. In 1899, the United States Department of War conducted a census of Puerto Rico finding that the population of Abras barrio was 1,183.

Sectors
Barrios (which are now like minor civil divisions) in turn are further subdivided into smaller local populated place areas/units called sectores (sectors in English). The types of sectores may vary, from normally sector to urbanización to reparto to barriada to residencial, among others.

The following sectors are in Abras barrio:

Abras

Abras Centro

Abras Mavilla

Mavilla Bridge

A bridge listed on the National Register of Historic Places in Puerto Rico is between Abras barrio and Palmarejo barrio, also in Corozal.

Features
PR-821 is the main north-south road through Abras.

See also

 List of communities in Puerto Rico
 List of barrios and sectors of Corozal, Puerto Rico

References

External links
 
 

Barrios of Corozal, Puerto Rico